The 1928 Western State Teachers Hilltoppers football team represented Western State Teachers College (later renamed Western Michigan University) as an independent during the 1928 college football season.  In their fifth and final season under head coach Earl Martineau, the Hilltoppers compiled a 5–2 record and outscored their opponents, 119 to 32. Center Dick Frankowski was the team captain.

Coach Martineau left Western State after the 1928 season to accept an assistant coaching position at Purdue.  In five years at Western State, Martineau compile a 26–10–2 record.

Schedule

References

Western State Teachers
Western Michigan Broncos football seasons
Western State Teachers Hilltoppers football